KZZX (105.3 FM) is a radio station licensed to serve Alamogordo, New Mexico.  The station is owned by Burt Broadcasting, Inc.  It airs a country music format.

The station was assigned the KZZX call letters by the Federal Communications Commission on July 11, 1995.

References

External links

ZZX
Country radio stations in the United States
Radio stations established in 1995